Clothing color (color of clothing) is an essential aspect of the aesthetic properties of clothing. The color of clothing has a significant impact on one's appearance. Our clothes communicate about us and reveal our social and economic standing.

Significance 
Color is a visual characteristic that is described by terms like red, orange, yellow, green, blue, purple etc.  Typically, it is the color of an object that attracts the most attention.  Color is one of the primary properties that is noticed when a consumer makes a decision to buy a dress. The colors are distinctive and distinguishable; we frequently refer to clothing by its color, for instance, a "blue shirt."

Self decoration 
Decoration of self is prevalent in societies, and self-decoration is a fundamental characteristic of humans. Decorative values of clothing are regarded as "primary if not the most primary." Hence, as a decorative element, color plays a critical part in meeting the necessary criterion.

Aesthetic comfort 
Colors create aesthetic comfort when combined with fabric construction, the finish of the clothing material, garment fitting, style, and fashion compatibility. All these elements collectively contribute to satisfying our visual perception.

Symbolic representations 

Historically, different societies have set their own restrictions and norms for different clothing. For example, during the Tudor period, the crimson red color was not allowed in the ranks below the “knights of the garter.” Colors of clothing have specific associations with certain types of clothing styles and symbolize cultural beliefs. Blue, for example, is closely associated with denim.

 The Saffron color is considered sacred in Hinduism, and Buddhism.
 Tekhelet in Judaism is the holiest color of Judasim. It is a blue or violet dye.
 The color green has a number of traditional associations in Islam. In the Quran, it is associated with paradise.

Social significance 
Colors have social, cultural and political significance. Clothing colors also discriminates. In the past, some societies and cultures have adopted unconventional fashion trends. Pink and blue, for example, have a gender stereotype. In Hinduism, for example, widows are required to wear white, and in contrast to this Brides in western cultures wear white wedding gowns. In Christianity, the color black is associated with mourning.

Identity 

Clothing color represents the identity of political parties, sports teams, and various professions. The Bharatiya Janata Party uses the saffron colour in their promotional activities. Cricket whites is a type of white colored uniform worn in the sports of cricket.  A white coat is a smock worn by professionals in the medical field or by those involved in laboratory work. There are various terms denoting groups of working individuals based on the colors of their collars worn at work. (See: Designation of workers by collar color)

 White-collar worker is a social class; person who performs intellectual labor.
 Blue-collar worker is a working-class person who performs manual labor.
 Pink-collar worker  is someone working in the care-oriented career field or in fields historically considered to be women’s work. This may include jobs in the beauty industry, nursing, social work, teaching, secretarial work, or child care.

Uniform 

A uniform depicts the use of a similar color of clothing in a group, organization, or profession.

School uniform 

A school uniform is a standardized outfit worn by students of an educational institution.

Military uniform 

A standardized dress worn by military personnel and paramilitary groups of various nations.

Political uniform 

A political uniform is distinctive clothing worn by members of a political movement.

Sportswear 

A Standardized sportswear may also function as a uniform for sports teams. In team sports, opposing teams is usually identified by their clothing colors, while individual team members can be identified by the back number on their shirt.

Dress or Garments by color names 
 Pink Chanel suit of Jacqueline Bouvier Kennedy
 White tie
 Little black dress
 Black Givenchy dress of Audrey Hepburn
 White dress of Marilyn Monroe
 Marilyn Monroe's pink dress
 Black dress of Rita Hayworth

Fashion 

Color of clothing is a key factor in capturing people's attention and persuading them to purchase a product.

Quotes

Psychology 
psychologists believe that the colour of our clothing influences our stress levels and moods. Color enhances a person's experience of their surroundings.

Literature

The colour saffron is associated with the goddess of dawn (Eos in Greek mythology and Aurora in Roman mythology) in classical literature:
Homer's Iliad:Now when Dawn in robe of saffron was hastening from the streams of Okeanos, to bring light to mortals and immortals, Thetis reached the ships with the armor that the god had given her. (19.1)Virgil's Aeneid:Aurora now had left her saffron bed,

And beams of early light the heav'ns o'erspread,

When, from a tow'r, the queen, with wakeful eyes,

Saw day point upward from the rosy skies.

Value addition 
Greige goods have limited shades ranging from offwhite to white, colors add value to the products. Application of color involves many textile arts such as dyeing, printing, painting, etc. Royal blue dye is one of the costliest dye to obtain the Royal blue hues. Different colors have different cost because of longer and shorter dye cycles.

Application 
Colors can be applied to textiles in a variety of ways, the most common of which are dyeing and printing. Dyeing is a uniform color application, whereas in printing, color is applied in certain patterns. Coloring has a set of procedures.

Seasons and colors 
Retailers and buyers design the merchandise as per the seasonal forecast. Primarily, there are four seasons: spring, summer, autumn and winter.  Some fast fashion brands, like Zara, have more than four seasonal changes on their shelves.

There are professional organizations that forecast colors, such as the Color Marketing Group, Color Association of the United States, and International Colour Authority.

Color matching systems 
Pantone is a standardized color reproduction system that conveys colors through color matching systems. These standards can be used by manufacturers all over the world.

Production 
Textile dyeing mills use color standards in physical and digital forms for the reproduction of these colors. Physical color standards are cut pieces of reference colors, whereas digital color standards are known as "QTX files" (Spectral data), which is a more efficient method.

When working with colour matching and quality control software, it is possible to import a QTX file. With regard to colour, a QTX file is simply a text file containing reflectance measurements for the colour in question.

Measurement (Delta-E) 
Color is a subjective visual perception that varies between individuals. There are spectrophotometers that can objectively compare spectral values and colors. Though colors are viewed visually and digitally, both depend on the customer's requirements. Delta E (dE-CMC) expresses the difference between the original standard and the reproduction.

Alternative technologies for color application

Structural coloration 
Microstructures that interfere with the light cause structural coloration. Some examples of structural coloration include bird feathers and butterfly wings. (see:Iridescence)

Nanocoating (of microscopically structured surfaces fine enough to interfere with visible light) in textiles for biomimetics is the new method of structural coloration without dyes. In structural coloration, interference effects are used to create colors instead of using pigments or dyes.

Gallery

See also 

 Color analysis (art)
 Clothing laws by country
 Color appearance model
 Colour fastness
 Court dress
 Dress code
 International Commission on Illumination
 Political colour
Textile sample

References 

Clothing
Color appearance phenomena
Textiles
Visual perception
Color of clothing
Articles containing video clips